The polar bear jail (officially known as the  Polar Bear Holding Facility) is a special building in Churchill, Manitoba, Canada where polar bears that are considered troublesome or dangerous are isolated before they can be relocated.

History 
Before establishing the facility, polar bears which were considered dangerous used to be shot. The holding facility was first established in 1982 (according to other sources, in 1983, after a person was mauled by a bear on the street) in the building officially named "House D-20", a former military morgue.

The facility is the subject of the poem "Churchill Bear Jail" by Salish Chief Victor A. Charlo.

Keeping the animals 
Initially, the facility had 20 cells, which could hold 16 single bears and four family groups. The bears could be held from two to 30 days – if a bear had been captured repeatedly, the term may have been extended. The premise is that extended captivity would create a sense of danger for the bears so that they will be reluctant to approach the town. The bears are not fed during the captivity. Since bears' natural cycle involves long periods of fasting, their bodies are adapted to going without food for an extended time.

Dangerous bears are tranquilized when captured and are marked with a bright paint on the neck. Closer to the winter, when the ice in the Hudson Bay has set, the bears are released. They are tranquilized again and transported by helicopter far from the town.

In 2014, the jail was extended to 28 cells. The inhabitants of Churchill still have to be careful outside, as the outskirts of the city are said to be visited by about a thousand polar bears in the summer. With the ice gone, they are unable to hunt their primary prey – seals – and, suffering from hunger, they approach the town and threaten the inhabitants.

There are signs cautioning "Polar Bear Alert" on the Hudson bay shore and Churchill river, and a person noticing a polar bear can call the designated number, upon which the workers of the Department of Natural Resources will come out and catch the bear.

References 

Buildings and structures in Churchill, Manitoba
Geography of Manitoba
Polar bears in popular culture